Offei is a surname. Notable people with the surname include:

Gideon Ofori Offei (born 1999), Ghanaian footballer
Michael Offei (born 1966), British actor
Stephen Offei (born 1986), Ghanaian footballer

See also
Ofei, surname